The Peechelba East railway line was a railway line in North Eastern Victoria, Australia, branching off of the North East railway line at Bowser railway station. It was opened on 31 October 1927 and closed on 8 December 1986.

History 
The line was opened on 31 October 1927, to serve soldier settlers in the area. The Country Roads Board and three local shires contributed to the cost of a bridge to link Peechelba with the new station, which was renamed Peechelba East in March 1948. The line was closed to all traffic in December 1986, along with many other lines elsewhere in the state.

Line Guide 
The line branched from the North East railway line at Bowser station. There were only two stations.
Boorhaman
Peechelba East

References 

Closed regional railway lines in Victoria (Australia)
Railway lines opened in 1927
Railway lines closed in 1986